The Canon FD 55mm ƒ/1.2 AL is a camera lens made by Canon, first introduced alongside the Canon F-1 single-lens reflex camera in March 1971. It was the first lens for any 35mm SLR system to incorporate an aspherical element. The lens was manufactured until 1980.

Design 

The FD 55mm ƒ/1.2 AL uses a variation of the double-Gauss lens design, in which the positive meniscus element of the front Gauss pair is aspherical. In total, the lens has 8 elements in six groups: a front element, two Gauss pairs, and three additional rear elements.

Variants 
In March 1975, Canon introduced a multicoated version of the lens, known as the FD 55mm ƒ/1.2 S.S.C. Aspherical.

Radioactivity 
Like a number of other contemporary lenses, the Canon FD 55mm ƒ/1.2 AL incorporated thoriated glass, a kind of optical glass that is doped with thorium dioxide. The inclusion of this compound makes the glass radioactive.

Over time, thorium decay causes F-centers to form in the glass, resulting in an amber discoloration. The discoloration can be repaired by exposure to a source of ultraviolet radiation, such as direct sunlight.

References 

Canon FD lenses